A localized, but destructive and deadly tornado outbreak impacted Tennessee, Alabama, and Georgia on Leap Day in 1952. Thanks in part to unseasonably strong jet stream winds and a strong cold front, eight tornadoes left trails of damage and casualties. The tornado to cause the most casualties was an F1 tornado in Belfast, Tennessee, which killed three people and injured 166. A violent F4 tornado moved through Fayetteville, Tennessee, destroying most of the town and killing two and injuring 150 others. On the north side of Fort Payne, Alabama, an F3 tornado caused major damage and injured 12 people. In all, the outbreak killed five, injured 336, and caused $3.1 million (1952 USD) in damage. Four more fatalities and 14 more injuries occurred from other non-tornadic events as well.

Meteorological synopsis

On February 29, 1952, a strong cold front extending down from a low-pressure area spanned from Southern Indiana and Central Ohio southwestward through Central Arkansas into North Texas. A strong upper-level trough at the 500 mbar level was also noted. The trough extended southeastward through the Central and Southern Plains states, where a second and third surface low had just combined behind the surface cold front. The combination of the strong cold front, strong low, and the unusually strong jet stream winds, led to the development of severe thunderstorms and tornadoes across portions of the Tennessee Valley in southern Middle Tennessee and Northeast Alabama.

Confirmed tornadoes

February 29 event

Fayetteville, Tennessee

This large, violent, and deadly F4 tornado touched down on the west side of downtown Fayetteville just northwest of the Old Lincoln County Hospital and moved east-northeast directly through it before dissipating near the Lincoln County Livestock Market along US 64.

Of the 1,828 buildings in Fayetteville, 932 were damaged or destroyed. In all, 139 homes were destroyed, 152 had major damage, and another 164 sustained minor damage. An additional 23 farm buildings were destroyed, 15 others had major damage, and 11 more had minor damage. 105 businesses were destroyed, while 58 others had major damage; 37 more sustained minor damage, and nine additional ones had superficial damage. Damage to six churches alone in downtown Fayetteville were estimated at $300,000. Several business houses were destroyed, power and communications lines were damaged over a large area; and hundreds of huge shade trees were uprooted. Two people were killed, 150 others were injured, and losses totaled $2.5 million, although the NWS Huntsville and Climatological Data National Summary (CDNS) gives a value of over $3 million. As of 2022, this is one of only two violent tornadoes to strike on a Leap Day (February 29) with other being another EF4 tornado that struck Harrisburg, Illinois, in 2012. Despite the extreme damage, Grazulis assessed the tornado as having caused F3-level damage.

Fort Payne, Alabama

This large, intense F3 tornado first touched down between 15th and 16th Streets in Minvale on the north side of Fort Payne. It blew down three large trees upon touching down, including one that missed a house by only . It then leveled a house, "leaving only enough...for a good sized bonfire." All but one of the five occupants escaped without injury. As the tornado moved in the direction of Gault Avenue (US 11), a large storage house was leveled "as flat as a pool table." An electric refrigerator, a bicycle, other toys and large pieces of furniture were all crushed inside the structure. The tornado then tore down large trees, tore off roofs, smashed out windows, and then tore into the telephone and power lines along Gault Avenue at the Black Motel, where considerable damage was done to the owner's home.

As the tornado tore through Wills Valley, large sheets of tin were hurled into power and telephone lines, severing dozens of the wires. A huge neon sign at the Lefty Cooper café, which was on the southern fringe of the tornado, was turned 90° from north–south to east–west, and a large cattle truck at the Fort Payne Sales Barn was completely flipped over. Additionally, two nearby cars were tossed  before being rolled up into a ball of scrap. Behind the Sales Barn, sheets of galvanized roofing metal were strewn through a field up to a mile away, and many sheets lodged themselves in trees all over Lookout Mountain. The tornado also heavily damaged another house on the mountain that overlooked Beason Gap before weakening and dissipating in Lakewood shortly after that.

It also destroyed 25 other buildings and damaged 35 others. Although no damage value was given, it is estimated that tornado did anywhere between $150,000 to $400,000 in damage. There were 12 injuries.

Non-tornadic impacts
Early on February 29, in Valley View, Texas, strong straight-line winds accompanied by pea-sized hail damaged the roofs of multiple buildings. That evening, a destructive squall line passed over Chattanooga, Tennessee, toppling sign boards, radio and TV aerials, breaking plate glass windows along Market and Broad Streets, and breaking telephone and power lines. The squall line moved rapidly eastward, passing over Lovell Field at 8:17 pm and capsizing several small aircraft. Another windstorm moved through Cleveland, Tennessee, although damage from this storm was confined to blown-down sign boards and forest land. A  area in Monteagle, Tennessee, suffered heavy damage, with multiple buildings unroofed and signs blown down. Light damage also occurred outside outside this small area.

The same storm system bought heavy snow to parts of the Mid-Atlantic and Northeastern United States on March 1. Snowfall rates of  an hour slowed traffic to a crawl in multiple counties of Southeastern Pennsylvania. In Harrisburg, Pennsylvania, a man died while shoveling heavy snow. In Philadelphia, one person was killed and four others were injured after their car, whose driver was blinded by snow, crashed into a traffic island. In New Jersey,  of snow was recorded throughout the state, with the heaviest snow in the south. One person was killed and 10 others were injured due to afternoon rush hour traffic accidents attributed to the storm. Most roads were blocked during the morning hours, but normal traffic resumed by mid- to late afternoon. Damage was estimated at several thousand dollars. Most of the damage was to automobiles, although there was some damage to power and communication lines. In Delaware, an Air Force corporal was killed when he was hit by a car while pushing his own car, which had stalled in the snow. Traffic tie-ups were also reported Maryland and a few power failures were reported for several hours in Baltimore.

Severe weather from February 29 continued overnight into the morning of March 1. In Darlington, South Carolina, trees were uprooted and limbs and television aerials were blown down. Another thunderstorm in Newberry, South Carolina, destroyed a home and damaged a few others, although the event may have occurred late on February 29.

Aftermath and historical significance
The F4 tornado that hit Fayetteville, Tennessee, was the fourth tornado to strike the city in 100 years. The previous tornadoes occurred on March 14, 1851; March 27, 1890; and April 29, 1909, all of which took similar paths. In Fort Payne, Alabama, the northern half of town was left without lights and telephones for several hours as power crews worked under large spot lights to remove hot wires and restore new ones as best they could.

See also
 List of North American tornadoes and tornado outbreaks
 List of F4 and EF4 tornadoes
 Tornado outbreak sequence of April 28 – May 2, 1953
 Tornado outbreak of November 27–30, 2016

Notes

References

External links
 Fayetteville Tornado of 1952

Tornadoes of 1952
F4 tornadoes
Tornadoes in Tennessee
Tornadoes in Alabama
Tornadoes in Georgia (U.S. state)